Irreligion in Romania is rare. Romania is one of the most religious countries in Europe, with 92% of people saying that they believe in God. Levels of Irreligion are much lower than in most other European countries and are among the lowest in the world. At the 2011 census, only 0.11% of the population declared itself atheist, up from the 2002 census, while 0.10% do not belong to any religion.
However, since 2000, religion in Romania is in decline. This is mainly because changing generation, as newer generations tend to be less religious. Also, especially in urban areas, while many people declare themselves as Chrsitian Ortodox at census, they mainly state it due to the fact that they are baptized under the Ortodox Church, although their knowledge about religion is low, also in particular many are saying that are not religious, not practicing, not praying, not going to church. While still one of the most religious countries in Europe, church attendance is quite  low, and is mainly done by elderly people and mainly in rural areas, while in urban areas church attendance is much lower. In Romania, women tend to be more religious than men, especially those living in rural areas.

History 
Prior to Romania's independence from the Ottoman Empire, church and state were closely aligned. As an independent country, Romania was able to set its own religious policies, allowing for some level of separation of church and state. Freethought and anti-clericalism were imported to Romania from Western Europe in the mid-19th century. Proponents of freethought, such as Constantin Thiron and Panait Zosin of the University of Iasi, worked to spread the philosophy, though it remained relatively obscure in the country. One early debate over secularism in Romania was that of cremation; the Orthodox church opposed cremation and came into conflict with secular advocates of the practice until its legalization in 1936.

Marxist atheism became prominent in Romania after the country fell under Communist rule in 1945. The Orthodox Church was severely restricted in its practices, and minor religions were banned entirely. Due to the prevalence of the Orthodox Church in Romanian society, state atheism was not implemented to the extent that it was in many other Communist countries. Instead, the Communist Party prioritized propaganda against religion in favor of Marxist science. Priests were also converted into propagandists and spies for the Communist regime. After the Communist regime fell in 1989, atheism was widely marginalized in Romania due to its associations with the terrors of Communism. Remus Cernea is seen as the leader of freethought and atheist belief in the early 21st century.

While religion was more popular during the 90's, it is declining since 2000. Also, church attendance saw a decline, and the number of atheists or irreligious but spiritual is increasing. This is mainly due to generation changing, decreasing rural population ( where most of religious people live), new conception of newer generations or change in society. Also irreligion and atheism tend to be higher in urban areas and well developed cities than in rural areas and lower developed areas, although even in lower developed areas there have been a decrease in religion. Also, people who came back in Romania from other countries after a long time (Working, temporary residence) tend to be less religious or even irreligious. There are also people that are loosing religion, due to the fact that they are considering the religion is of no help or other reasons. 

Also there are many people which, although they declare themselves christian or ortodox due to the fact that they are ortodox baptized, they have little knowledge about this, and in particular they declare themselves either as atheist or irreligious. Very few usually practice real religion (like praying, fasting or caring about holy periods, these being mainly considered days off from work or school). While still a religious country, church attendance lowered since 2000, and continues to the present day. Also, the number of religious people is in decline due to emigration.

Demographics 
Over 20,700 people in Romania are atheists, according to 2011 census. Thus, the number of Romanians who do not believe in God almost tripled in the previous decade. The highest concentration is in Bucharest–Ilfov area (nearly 8,000 atheists) and generally wealthy areas of the country (Transylvania, Banat), the lowest – in Oltenia (750), Dobruja and poor areas of Wallachia (Teleorman, Călărași, Ialomița). Before the census of October 2011, Secular Humanist Association (ASUR) conducted a campaign through which tried to promote an accurate census, in which people who consider themselves atheists to have confidence in selecting this option. According to ASUR, European Values Survey (1999) and World Values Survey (2005) polls show that the real percentage of those who declare themselves atheists is at least 6–7% of the population, 60–70 times more than the result of census in 2002. In The Cambridge Companion to Atheism (2006), Phil Zuckerman gives a figure of 4%. A 2014 poll by WIN/Gallup International Association shows that 16% of Romanians are not religious and only 1% are convinced atheists.

Surveys

Socio-demographic profile 

According to a study conducted by researchers from Open Society Foundations, Romanian atheists are a very young group and with a significantly higher level of education that the national average: 53% of atheists are under 30 years, and 33% of them have completed higher education. The group of atheists/agnostics/persons without religion lives in a proportion of 59% in urban areas – in the capital and other major cities – and are easier to find in Wallachia and harder in Moldavia.

Atheists are more intolerant than most Romanians with regard to almost all social groups on which were questioned: Roma, sectarians, Hungarians, Muslims, Jews and poor. The only exception to this string of intolerance is represented by homosexuals, towards them atheists showing more tolerance than the national average. As ideological positioning, atheists declare themselves, equally, both right-wing and left-wing, most of them (56%) placing at the center of the ideological line. Only eight percent say they prefer leftist economic policies, while right-wing economic policies attract 47% of atheists.

See also 
 Demographics of Romania
 List of countries by irreligion
 Religion in Romania

External links 
 Atei și Agnostici Români (AAR)

References 

 
Religion in Romania
Romania